Lionel Lockyer, sometimes spelled Lionel Lockier, (c.1600 – 26 April 1672) was a 17th-century quack doctor famous for his miracle pills that he claimed included sunbeams as an ingredient. He was born in the Southwark area of London. He has a tomb in Southwark Cathedral.

Life and work

Little reliable information exists about Lockyer's life and work. Contemporary sources primarily consist of promotional material written by Lockyer and his supporters and also of a far less flattering account given by George Starkey, an Alchemist and rival pill maker.

One advertising broadsheet, published after Lockyer's death, describes him as an "authoriz'd physician and chymist" with "at least Forty Years Experience and Practice, both in England and most Foreign Parts". It describes him as having lived in St Thomas's Southwark prior to his death.

Starkey provides an unflattering account of Lockyer's early career: Lockyer was a tailor and a butcher before turning to medicine, that he was a poor student, and that his first "invented" medicinal concoction was to add colouring to an existing common medicine. It is claimed that he also worked on making the philosopher's stone. His medical licence required his practice be at least 8 miles outside of London.

Lockyer's Pill
Lockyer's most notable product was his eponymous pill, which his advertisements describe as:

"those most excellent Pills called, Pillulae Radijs Solis Extracta BEING an universall medicine especially in all chronical and difficult Distempers".

While the name implies that they contained an extract of sunbeams, the actual composition is unknown as Lockyer kept the recipe a secret. The pills were claimed to cure all curable ailments and to work better with larger doses. Descriptions of the effect of the pills vary, however an emetic effect was often described. One claims:

"Sometimes it works upwards and sometimes downwards, and it may be both ways at once, although it is never violent."

Lockyer had growing success selling his pills and it is claimed, in an anonymous letter of endorsement, that Lockyer had demonstrated his pills before the King at Southampton House in 1664. Lockyer also attracted the attention of rivals. George Starkey, published a tract called A smart scourge for a Silly Sawcy Fool, attacking Lockyer and casting doubt on the authenticity of the letter of endorsement. He also gives his account of Lockyer's background and mocks both his pills and the poor quality of his Latin.

Death and monument

Lockyer died on 26 April 1672. He is interred in Southwark Cathedral where he has a prominent monument in the north transept featuring a large semi-recumbent figure of himself. The epitaph reads:

Following Lockyer's death, his pills continued to be sold by Lockyer's nephew, John Watts, in partnership with Thomas Fyge, an apothecary. The pills were sold wholesale in tins of 50 or 100 at a price of 4 shillings for 100.

References

1672 deaths
People from Southwark
Burials at Southwark Cathedral
Year of birth uncertain
1600s births